The Passing Stranger is a 1954 British crime film written and directed by John Arnold, produced by Anthony Simmons (who also wrote the original film story) and Ian Gibson-Smith, with Leon Clore serving as the film's executive producer, for Harlequin Productions. The film stars Lee Patterson, Diane Cilento and Duncan Lamont.

Plot
Chick, an American soldier serving in Europe, has deserted and is trying to find his way back to the US. After falling in with a gang of criminals, he is on the run after a robbery went wrong, and hides up at a roadside café near a small British town (Banbury). One of the owners of the café, Jill, falls for him and they make a plan to run away together.

Cast
 Lee Patterson as Chick 
 Diane Cilento as Jill 
 Duncan Lamont as Fred 
 Olive Gregg as Meg 
 Liam Redmond as Barnes 
 Harold Lang as Spicer 
 Mark Dignam as Inspector 
 Paul Whitsun-Jones as Lloyd 
 Alfie Bass as Harry 
 Cameron Hall as Maxie 
 George A. Cooper as Charlie 
 Lyndon Brook as Mike

Critical reception
TV Guide wrote "This decent second feature tries hard but fails because of script limitations"; whereas Allmovie called it "a passing good little film noir."

References

External links

1954 films
1954 crime films
British black-and-white films
British crime films
Films set in England
1950s English-language films
1950s British films